Sacred Hearts Club is the third studio album by American indie pop band Foster the People, released on July 21, 2017, through Columbia Records. The album was preceded by the extended play III, which is composed of three tracks from the album. Departing from the organic, acoustic sound of their previous 2014 album, it draws upon soul, dance, and electronic genres while maintaining their signature indie pop sound. The lyrics address themes of love, politics, fame, and youth, and, similar to their previous albums, are often at odds with the upbeat musical production. This is also their first studio album to feature long-time touring musicians Isom Innis and Sean Cimino as official members. It is also the band's final album to feature drummer Mark Pontius, who left the band in October 2021. It received primarily mixed reviews upon release, with many critics praising the experimentation while disliking the album's lack of musical consistency. Despite the mixed reception, the album's single "Sit Next to Me" has reached a peak of number 42 on the Billboard Hot 100 and sold over two million copies across North America.

Background
Foster the People began promoting new music following extensive touring in support of their second studio album, Supermodel (2014), in late 2016. During the recording sessions, Foster described waking up each day and witnessing tragedies, traumatic events and political scandals in the news; citing that the band sought to create an album of joy amidst the chaos of current events. The band performed three brand new songs, entitled "Pay the Man", "Lotus Eater", and "Doing It for the Money", at Rocking the Daisies Music Festival, announcing that they would release their third studio album. On April 5, 2017, the band announced a headlining summer tour in North America in support of the album.

The band released the three-track III (EP) on April 27, 2017. It is composed of three brand new tracks, "Pay the Man", "Doing It for the Money", and "SHC", all of which appear on Sacred Hearts Club. Each song was accompanied with a visual music video uploaded on the band's official Vevo channel. Sacred Hearts Club was formally announced on June 13, 2017, with the premiere of an online short documentary revealing the album's title and release date.

Singles
The album spawned three singles: "Doing It for the Money", released on April 21, 2017; "Loyal Like Sid & Nancy", released as the second single on June 30, 2017; and "Sit Next to Me", released on July 24, 2017, as the third single.

Sound and influence
In the band's online short documentary titled Sacred Hearts Club (the beginning), it was revealed that the album would "feature '60s-inspired sounds and a psychedelic influence". The genres of the songs primarily range from soul, R&B, dance, electronic, to psychedelia. The composition of the album included programmed beats sampled from recordings of Pontius' drumming during live performances in 2013, also incorporating elements from the band's jam sessions. Foster has stated that the album was compiled from two distinct records' worth of material, one with a psychedelic/surf rock focus, and one within the genre of hip-hop.

Critical reception

Sacred Hearts Club received mixed reviews from critics, attaining a Metacritic score of 56 based on nine reviews, indicating "mixed or average reviews". The album was praised for its experimentation, while being criticized for a lack of consistency. Critics also noted a failure to recapture the band's old sound, often noting their breakthrough hit "Pumped Up Kicks" in reference. Numerous critics also praised the lyrical content and musical departure from their two previous albums.

Track listing

Notes
  signifies a co-producer.
  signifies an additional producer.
 "Orange Dream" contains a sample of "Prelude", as performed by Parliament.

Personnel
Foster the People
 Mark Foster – vocals, synthesizer (tracks 1–5, 7–12); programming (tracks 1, 4, 10, 12), guitar (tracks 1, 3–5, 7–9, 11), bass (tracks 1, 3–5, 7–9), piano (tracks 2, 7, 10), tubular bells (tracks 2, 5), bass synth (tracks 2, 4), percussion (track 5), celeste (track 7), Omnichord (tracks 8, 9)
 Mark Pontius – drums (tracks 1, 4), percussion (track 7)
Isom Innis – drum programming (tracks 1, 2, 4, 5, 10, 12), programming (tracks 1, 2, 4, 6, 10, 12), drums (tracks 1, 2, 4–10), percussion (tracks 1, 2, 4, 5, 10), synthesizer (tracks 2, 4–7, 10, 12), bass (track 6), piano, backing vocals (track 12)
 Sean Cimino – guitar (tracks 4, 5, 7, 8)

Additional personnel

 Austin Mensales – guitar
 Derek "MixedByAli" Ali – mix engineering
 Manny Marroquin – mix engineering
 Chris Galland – mix engineering
 Rich Costey – mix engineering
 Martin Cooke – mix engineering
 Nicolas Fournier – mix engineering
 Jeff Jackson – engineering assistance
 Robin Florent – engineering assistance
 Cyrus "Nois" Taghipour – engineering assistance
 Tyler Page – engineering assistance
 Greg Calbi – master engineering
 Steve Fallone – master engineering
 Josh Abraham – production
 Oliver Goldstein – production, drums
 Lars Stalfors – production
 Jena Malone – guest vocals ("Static Space Lover")
 Gabe Noel – cello

Charts

References

2017 albums
Columbia Records albums
Foster the People albums